Steve Roller (born February 20, 1954) is an American athlete. He competed in the men's javelin throw at the 1984 Summer Olympics.

References

1954 births
Living people
Athletes (track and field) at the 1984 Summer Olympics
American male javelin throwers
Olympic track and field athletes of the United States
Sportspeople from Rochester, Minnesota
Track and field athletes from Minnesota